The Sixteenth Tamil Nadu Legislative Assembly Election was held on 6 April 2021, to elect representatives from the 234 constituencies in the Indian state of Tamil Nadu. The Dravida Munnetra Kazhagam (DMK) won the election, ending the decade-long reign of the All India Anna Dravida Munnetra Kazhagam (AIADMK). The DMK's leader M. K. Stalin became the eighth Chief Minister of Tamil Nadu, and the 12th Chief Minister since the 1956 reorganization. He replaced Edappadi K. Palaniswami of the AIADMK.

The poll was Tamil Nadu's first assembly election after the demises of the two most prominent Chief Ministers in the state's modern history, J. Jayalalithaa—general secretary of the AIADMK, and M. Karunanidhi—president of the DMK, who died in 2016 and 2018 respectively. With the AIADMK winning the 2016 election, Jayalalithaa became the Chief Minister and served for almost six months. Upon her death, O. Panneerselvam took charge as the Chief Minister, shortly after which Palaniswami was sworn in instead in 2017, who served till the end of the fifteenth assembly's tenure. The Election Commission of India announced the schedule for the elections in Tamil Nadu to the sixteenth Tamil Nadu Legislative Assembly on 26 February 2021.

The DMK continued its Secular Progressive Alliance (SPA) with the Indian National Congress, the Communist parties and many others, and named Stalin as its candidate for the Tamil Nadu Chief Minister's Office. The AIADMK joined the National Democratic Alliance (NDA) of the Bharatiya Janata Party, the ruling party of the Union Government of India, with Palanisami as its Chief Ministerial candidate. The polling was held on 6 April 2021 under COVID-19 guidelines. The state recorded a voter turnout of 72.81%. Surveys before and after the polls predicted the Stalin-led SPA to win the elections with a large margin. The votes were counted on 2 May 2021; the SPA amassed 159 seats, with the DMK alone winning in 133 constituencies, securing an absolute majority for the first time in 25 years. The NDA won 75 seats, out of which 66 were of the AIADMK. The DMK formed the Government of Tamil Nadu for the sixth time; Stalin and his council of ministers were sworn in on 7 May 2021.

Overview
The state of Tamil Nadu is divided into 234 assembly constituencies, each of which elects a member (called an MLA) to represent it at the state's unicameral legislative assembly, as per Article 168 of the Constitution of India. The Tamil Nadu Legislative Assembly convenes at Fort St. George, Chennai. The member that manages to receive the support of the majority of the members of the assembly (that is the Chief Ministerial candidate of the party that secures more than 50% of the seats), which is a minimum of 118 members, is appointed as the Chief Minister of Tamil Nadu, who is the executive head of the Government of Tamil Nadu. The Governor of Tamil Nadu, the state's ceremonial head, will invite the Chief-Minister-elect and his Council of Ministers to be sworn in, to lead the state government for a term of the next five years.

 

Tamil Nadu's partisan politics have been dominated by its two regional Dravidian parties, Dravida Munnetra Kazhagam (DMK) and All India Anna Dravida Munnetra Kazhagam (AIADMK), for the last 50 years (since 1967). Each recognized party in India is given a polling symbol by the Election Commission of India, an independent and neutral body of officers that conducts and regulates all the elections in the country. The DMK contests with the Rising Sun symbol, while the AIADMK contests with the Two Leaves.

The legislative assembly of Tamil Nadu goes to polls alongside the legislative assemblies of three other Indian states, namely Assam, Kerala, and West Bengal, and that of the union territory of Puducherry.

Background 

Since the death of AIADMK founder M.G Ramachandran (who had been in power since 1977) in 1987, DMK's M Karunanidhi (who came into prominence in 1969 following the death of DMK founder C.N Annadurai) & AIADMK's J Jayalalitha heavily dominated the state's politics. DMK won the 1989, 1996 & 2006 elections while AIADMK won the 1991, 2001 & 2011 elections. In 2016, AIADMK retained its majority with 136 seats, while the DMK increased its strength to 98 seats. Jayalalitah became the second incumbent Chief minister of Tamil Nadu to be re-elected back in power since MGR. 2021's election of the sixteenth assembly election is the first state election after the deaths of Jayalalithaa and Karunanidhi, who died in 2016 and 2018 respectively.

Rise of V.K. Sasikala 
Following Jayalalithaa's demise from cardiac arrest on 5 December 2016, O. Panneerselvam of the AIADMK became the Chief Minister of Tamil Nadu for the third time. The first two times he attained the post (21 September 2001 to 2 March 2002, and 28 September 2014 to 23 May 2015) was when Jayalalithaa was forcibly removed from office twice due to the lawsuit against her. He served as the Acting Chief Minister during Jayalalithaa's hospitalization in 2016. However, soon after swearing-in, Panneerselvam rebelled against the influence of V. K. Sasikala, a long-time friend and close associate of Jayalalithaa, inside the AIADMK party, and deemed her a threat to his Chief Ministership, exposing the factionalism inside the party. In a meeting of the party's general council held on 29 December 2016, the first meeting after Jayalalithaa's death, Sasikala was appointed as the party's general secretary. On 5 February 2017, all the MLAs of the AIADMK unanimously elected Sassikala as the Legislative Assembly leader of the AIADMK, making her the Chief-Minister-elect officially.

On 6 February 2017, Panneerselvam submitted his resignation letter to then Governor of Tamil Nadu, C. Vidyasagar Rao, who accepted the resignation but instructed him to continue to functioning as Chief Minister "until alternate arrangements are made", awaiting the pending verdict of the 18-year-long trial regarding the disproportionate assets of Jayalalithaa and Sasikala. Panneerselvam also claimed that he was coerced into resignation. Later in the evening, Sasikala met the Governor and laid claims to the Chief Ministership, by submitting the list of AIADMK legislators who back her. Reports stated Sasikala had those MLAs sequestered at a resort in South Chennai.

This restored in toto her earlier conviction in the case delivered on 27 September 2014. Proceedings against Jayalalithaa had been abated and dismissed on account of her death. The conviction effectively ended Sasikala's Chief Ministerial ambitions.

Following Sasikala's conviction, the Governor rejected her claims to become the Chief Minister of Tamil Nadu. In her ticking 24-hour surrender time-limit and capacity as the general secretary of the AIADMK, Sasikala convened the party's MLAs, who unanimously elected Edappadi K. Palaniswami, a then supporter of Sasikala, as the new Chief Minister. She also appointed her nephew and former treasurer of the party, T. T. V. Dhinakaran, as the party's deputy general secretary. Palaniswami as sworn in as the Chief Minister of Tamil Nadu the next day, replacing Panneerselvam.

On 23 March 2017, the Election commission of India designated the two factions separately; Panneerselvam's faction known as "AIADMK (PURATCHI THALAIVI AMMA)", while Dhinakaran-Palaniswami's faction known as "AIADMK (AMMA)". By-polls were announced at the Dr. Radhakrishnan Nagar constituency, which was vacated due to Jayalalithaa's death. Dhinakaran was named candidate by his faction. However, the Election Commission canceled the by-polls after evidence of large-scale bribing by the ruling AIADMK (AMMA) surfaced. On 17 April 2017, Delhi Police registered a case against Dhinakaran for allegedly attempting to bribe the Election Commission into giving the AIADMK's significant Two Leaves symbol to his faction. Dhinakaran was granted bail on the grounds that the police failed to identify the bribed officer.

In the following months, the Chief Minister had a fallout with Dhinakaran. Palaniswami pronounced Dhinakaran's appointment as deputy general secretary "invalid" on 17 August 2017, and ousted him from the party. On 21 August 2017, it was reported that the Paneerselvam faction of AIADMK had decided to merge back with the Palaniswami faction, under the terms that Sasikala would be expelled from the party. On 21 August 2017, both Palaniswami and Paneerselvam factions of the AIADMK reunited, with the leaders assuming co-leadership of the party. Panneerselvam sworn in as the Deputy Chief Minister of Tamil Nadu, Finance Minister of Tamil Nadu and the coordinator of the AIADMK. Palaniswami was dubbed the deputy coordinator of the party. Mainstream media and publications suspected the involvement of the Bharatiya Janata Party, the ruling party of the Union Government of India, in the AIADMK's merger. This marked the first time the BJP began to play an influential role in the Tamil Nadu politics, acting as the mediator that united the two factions. Dhinakaran and his supporters continued to dub themselves the "real AIADMK".

On 22 August 2017, 18 MLAs of the AIADMK pledged allegiance to Dhinakaran and submitted letters to the Governor, expressing lack of confidence in Palaniswami and withdrawing their support to the Palaniswami-led government. Immediately, those MLAs were expelled from the AIADMK. The Speaker of the fifteenth Tamil Nadu Legislative Assembly, P. Dhanapal, also disqualified those MLAs from their offices, citing the Constitution Act of 1985, which prevents the instability caused by democratically elected representatives in India's legislatures shifting allegiance from the parties they supported at the time of election, or disobeying their parties' decisions at critical times, by rendering their seats vacant. This resulted in a long legal battle, at the end of which, the Madras High Court, the highest court of Tamil Nadu, gave a verdict in the Speaker's favour and confirmed the disqualification of the 19 legislators. Following these events, Sasikala was expelled from the party on 12 September 2017, with her position as interim general secretary disputed and abolished. Instead, the late Jayalalithaa was named the eternal general secretary of AIADMK.

On 23 November 2017, the Election Commission of India granted the Two Leaves symbol to the Palaniswami-Panneerselvam led AIADMK, authorizing the faction as the original AIADMK, and announced by-polls to the vacant seat of Radhakrishnan Nagar on 21 December 2017. Dhinakaran contested in the constituency as an independent candidate, and won the election with a huge margin, with around 40,000 votes more than his closest competitor. He became the first independent candidate in Tamil Nadu history to win a bypoll, claiming 50.32% of the total votes, defeating the ruling AIADMK and the opposition DMK.

In March 2018, Dinakaran formed the new party Amma Makkal Munnettra Kazagam (AMMK), with the goal of obtaining control of the AIADMK.

Rise of M. K. Stalin 
After Karunanidhi's demise on 7 August 2018, Karunanidhi's son and political heir M. K. Stalin, who has served as the Deputy Chief Minister of Tamil Nadu and the Mayor of Chennai, became the unquestioned president of the DMK. The Election Commission of India announced by-polls to 24 vacant seats in the state, alongside the 2019 Indian parliamentary elections, which elects 543 members across India to its lower house, the Lok Sabha. The DMK-led Secular Progressive Alliance (nationally, United Progressive Alliance headed by the Indian National Congress) swept Tamil Nadu in the Lok Sabha elections, winning a landslide 38 seats out of the state's 39 parliamentary constituencies. The AIADMK, which contested the election in an alliance with the BJP and the regional DMDK, won only one seat (Theni). This marked a huge shift from the 2014 parliamentary elections, in which the AIADMK had won 37 seats solo, whereas the NDA won two and the DMK none. In the by-polls, out of the 24 formerly AIADMK seats in the state assembly, the Stalin-led DMK won over 13 seats while the AIADMK won 10, indicating a shift in the political mindset of the state's voters. Although the incumbent AIADMK government lost 13 of its seats to the opposition party, the 10 retained seats (with new MLAs to represent them) were enough to maintain the AIADMK's absolute majority at the Legislative Assembly.

Sasikala's Announcement
In January 2021, VK Sasikala was released from jail after completion of her prison time. In February 2021, she announced her intention to actively involve herself in the state's politics. Nevertheless, on 3 March 2021, she announced her decision to quit politics, to everyone's surprise.

Key Issues 
In order to improve the economy after the COVID-19 pandemic, both the AIADMK and DMK promised jobs in their manifestos. Industries, especially MSMEs, have been hit hard by the slowdown in the economy. The AIADMK-led government approved a sub-quota in MBC of 10.5% for the Vanniyars, who are particularly dominant in northern Tamil Nadu. The AIADMK & BJP also fulfilled the demand of grouping 7 castes under Devendrakula Velalar an agricultural community found in Tamil Nadu. Recent events such as the Thoothukudi protest in 2018 against the district's Sterlite Copper plant and the Kattupalli fishermen's agitation against the expansion of Adani port have also made environmental concerns, especially climate change, a topic of debate in the elections.

Madras High Court comments on Election Commission 

On 26 April 2021, the Madras High Court remarked that the Election Commission should be put on murder charges for allowing rallies. Further, the court said that the Election Commission was the only institution responsible for the deadly second wave of Covid-19 pandemic in India as the elections of four states and a union territory were being held when second wave was striking India.

Schedule

Manifestos
Election Manifesto plays a key role in determining the voting behaviour of the voters in the Tamil Nadu Electoral Politics. Enabling people with information about manifestos, promises, and candidate details through technology can ensure that it reaches a huge number of people.  Global Shapers Chennai, a non-partisan group powered by the World Economic Forum has released the TN Election Promises 2021 platform. The platform provides the voters with data and insights on the promises made by different parties, constituency-wise candidate background details (assets, education, criminal cases, etc.), and helps them compare the promises by categorizing them into different focus areas such as agriculture, education, etc., to help make an informed voting decision.

Voter statistics
According to the ECI, 62.6 million people were eligible to vote in upcoming assembly elections in Tamil Nadu. Sholinganallur assembly has the highest number of eligible voters with 694,845 voters.

Parties and alliances









Non-aligned parties

Campaigning
The DMK went on a campaign tour titled Vidiyalai Nokki Stalinin Kural, which began on 20 December 2020 at Thirukkuvalai, the birthplace of M. Karunanidhi. Palaniswami started the AIADMK's campaign at his hometown, Edappadi, on 19 December 2020. CM Palanisami also launched his "Vetrinadai Podum Tamilagam" campaign followed by "Thodarattu Vetrinadai" campaign

BJP politician and the 22nd Chief Minister of Uttar Pradesh, Yogi Adityanath, addressed a public rally in Coimbatore to support Vanathi Srinivasan on March 31, 2021. The BJP and the Hindu Munnani organized a bike rally where they shouted communal slogans. The BJP supporters also reportedly pelted stones at Muslim shops in the area. BJP candidate Vanathi Srinivasan described the stone-pelting incident as a minor incident while MNM president Kamal Haasan said that "riot specialists must be defeated through unity".

Opinion polls

Candidates 
Candidates from recognized parties contested in 234 constituencies on 6 April. The Indian National Congress candidate for Srivilliputhur Assembly constituency, P. S. W. Madhava Rao, died on 11 April 2021 after testing positive for COVID-19.

Voting
The state recorded 72.81% voter turnout, which is 2% lesser than the preceding 2016 election. Karur district recorded the highest voter turnout amongst the state's districts, with 83.92%. Chennai district turned out the lowest (59.06%).

Voter turnout by districts

Repoll 
The Election Commission of India, on 13 April 2021, declared the polling held at the polling station No. 92 in the Velachery Assembly constituency "void" under 58 (1)(b) of the Representation of the People Act, 1951. The commission ordered a repoll in the station on the basis of a report submitted by the returning officers and observers. Fresh voting was conducted on 17 April 2021 between 7 am and 7 pm IST. The repoll follows the suspension of three Greater Chennai Corporation officials for transporting two EVMs and one VVPAT machine of booth number 92 on a two-wheeler in the Velachery-Tharamani road.

Exit polls 
The Election Commission on March 24, banned the publication of any exit poll from 27 March till 7:30 PM of 29 April to prevent any influence on voters in the general election of West Bengal and by-elections in other states. On April 26, the ban period was advanced to 7:00 PM.

Results
The results were announced by the Election Commission of India on 2 May 2021, starting at 9 AM IST. The DMK won 133 constituencies on its own, receiving a simple majority in the sixteenth Tamil Nadu Legislative Assembly, whereas its SPA alliance saw victory in a total of 159 constituencies. Meanwhile, the NDA alliance captured 75 constituencies, out of which the AIADMK had won 66. Other parties, alliances, and independent candidates did not secure any seats. After spending a decade as the opposition party, the DMK won Tamil Nadu from the AIADMK, which reigned the state for two consecutive terms (2011-2021). The AIADMK assumed the position of the opposition party at the sixteenth Tamil Nadu Legislative Assembly.

Popular vote

By district

By constituency

Analysis and trends 

 In Northern Tamil Nadu, the Chennai Metropolitan Area and its surroundings proved to be a stronghold of the DMK. The DMK-led SPA completely swept all of the constituencies located in Chennai, Thiruvallur, and Kanchipuram districts. While facing tough competition in other parts of the North, the DMK bagged 64 of the region's 78 seats, overcoming the polarization between the AIADMK and the DMK that existed in the region in the 2016 election. The region expressed a strong anti-NDA trend, with the results indicating that the AIADMK did not benefit much from its alliance with the PMK and the 10.5% internal reservation that was granted to the Vanniyar community within the Most Backward Community (MBC) quota.
The politically sensitive Central Tamil Nadu and Kaveri delta region exhibited an overwhelming support for the SPA, with the AIADMK-led NDA winning only four out of the region's 41 seats. The DMK was met with victory in all the seats of Tiruchirappalli, Perambalur, Ariyalur and Mayiladuthurai districts, crucially. The resentment that prevailed amongst the region's farmers over the former AIADMK government's inability to resolve agricultural problems in the region has been cited as a reason.
Except Madurai district, which was equally split between the AIADMK and DMK, much of Southern Tamil Nadu swinged towards the DMK alliance, an anti-incumbent trend compared to 2016, in which the Jayalalithaa-led AIADMK (without the BJP) had swept most of the region's seats, except Kanyakumari district, which remained as an SPA stronghold. The region also gave the DMK its highest victory margin ever, with over 130,000 votes in Athoor constituency where its senior leader I. Periasamy defeated the PMK candidate.
The AIADMK maintained its traditional sway in Western Tamil Nadu, popularly known as Kongu Nadu, where the NDA won more than 70% of the constituencies. Most notably, the NDA won in all the constituencies of Coimbatore and Dharmapuri districts.
The cities of Tamil Nadu fuelled the DMK's victory in the election. 2021 exposed "a clear rural-urban divide" in the voting patterns of the state. Trends showed that DMK performed very well in the urban centres than the AIADMK. There are 154 rural, 30 semi-urban and 50 urban constituencies in the state. The DMK alliance won 40 of those urban seats, 96 of the rural seats and 23 of the semi-urban seats. Of the 75 seats the AIADMK alliance won, 58 were in rural areas, with only seven in semi-urban and 10 in urban centres. The SPA's strike rate was 80% in urban seats, 76% in semi-urban seats and 62% in rural seats, whereas the NDA's strike rate was 37% in rural seats, 23% in semi-urban seats and 20% in urban seats.

Reactions and aftermath 
Palaniswami and his ministers resigned on 3 May 2021, submitting their papers of resignation to Banwarilal Purohit, the Governor of Tamil Nadu. During the early hours of the same day, DMK president Stalin paid respects at the memorial of his father and five-time Chief Minister, M. Karunanidhi. Speaking to the journalists gathered there, Stalin stated that he will be sworn in as the Chief Minister in a simplistic ceremony that may be held at the Raj Bhavan, the Governor's residence. He underlined that the DMK will form the government for the sixth time in Tamil Nadu, and will follow the footsteps of Karunanidhi. Stalin added that the DMK's governance "will be such that those who had voted for the party will feel happy voting for it, and even those who did not vote would regret their decision to not have voted for the party".

After the resignation of Palanisami's administration, officials of the Public Works Department began resetting the Tamil Nadu Secretariat to prepare the campus for the new government under Stalin. The Chief Minister's Office returned all the files to the departments concerned, with the office quarters white-washed and name-boards of former ministers taken down.

Politicians, celebrities and government officials across India congratulated Stalin on his victory. The out-going Chief Minister Palanisami congratulated Stalin, tweeting: "My best wishes to M.K. Stalin who is going to take oath as Tamil Nadu Chief Minister". In another tweet, Stalin thanked Palanisami and sought his cooperation for "building the best Tamil Nadu". Narendra Modi, the Prime Minister of India, tweeted that he will work with Stalin to enhance the nation's progress, fulfill the regional interests of Tamil Nadu, and fight the COVID-19 pandemic.

On 10 May 2021, the newly elected AIADMK MLAs convened to choose the new Leader of the Opposition, an important post equivalent to a cabinet minister. The meeting was inconclusive, with both Panneerselvam and Palaniswami staking claims to the post, while their supporters hurled charges against each other. This included a prolonged quarrel between the two sections of the party outside the party's head office, causing unrest. Supporters of Palaniswami believed that he should be the Leader of the Opposition due to the party's good performance in the election in western Tamil Nadu, the region he hails from; whereas, Panneerselvam's supporters felt that the party fared poorly in other regions of the state due to Palaniswami's wrong policies during his Chief Ministerial tenure. Eventually, Palaniswami was elected as the Leader of the Opposition.

After MNM performed unfavorably in its first-ever election, many officials and candidates resigned from the party, such as its vice president Dr. Mahendran, Muruganandam,  C K Kumaravel. Mahendran said that "the attitude of Kamal Haasan towards the growth of the party has not been changed even after facing huge loss in the Tamil Nadu assembly election". He cited the presence of "Sankhya solutions" in the party and added that Haasan is being misguided. Others cited "personal reasons".

Formation of government 
On 3 May 2021, Durai Murugan, the general secretary of the DMK, called for a meeting of all the party's newly elected MLAs on 4 May 2021, at 4 PM, in Anna Arivalayam (the DMK headquarters, Chennai). In the meeting, the 133 MLAs formally extended their support to Stalin's appointment as the DMK's head at the Tamil Nadu Legislative Assembly, making him the Chief-Minister-elect. Stalin's council of ministers and their allocated departments were revealed on 6 May 2021. The Stalin administration took charge on 7 May 2021, sworn in by Governor Purohit, in a ceremony at Raj Bhavan. Stalin became the eighth Chief Minister of Tamil Nadu, and the twelfth Chief Minister since the linguistic reformation of the state's boundaries in 1956.

Notes

References

2021 State Assembly elections in India
State Assembly elections in Tamil Nadu
2020s in Tamil Nadu